Sidonia Făgărășan is a Romanian biological scientist who is a professor at the Riken Institute in Japan. Her research considers the molecular mechanisms that underpin processes in gut microbioata and the mucosal barrier. In 2020, she was awarded the Kobayashi Foundation Award.

Early life and career 
Făgărășan completed training in clinical medicine at Iuliu Hațieganu University of Medicine and Pharmacy. She was a medical resident in Cluj-Napoca, where she completed various training positions and was eventually made assistant professor. During her early career she became interested in the molecular mechanisms that underpin immune homeostasis. In 1998 she moved to Japan as a Visiting Researcher at Kyoto University, and remained there to complete a doctorate.

Research 
Făgărășan contributed to the discovery of Activated Induced Deaminase, and went on to short the role of AID in gut homeostasis. In 2002, Făgărășan was appointed leader of the Riken Laboratory for Mucosal Immunity at the Research Centre for Allergy and Immunology.

Făgărășan looks to understand the mechanisms between the microbiota and the immune system at the mucosal barrier. She looks to understand how the gut immune system contributes to the diversity, balance and metabolic functions of microbes. She showed that T-cells, the immune systems that protect the body from infections, change the body's metabolism.

Awards and honours 
 2005 Ministry of Education, Culture, Sports, Science and Technology Young Scientist Award
 2013 MEXT NISTEP Award
 2020 Kobayashi Award

Selected publications

References 

Year of birth missing (living people)
Living people
21st-century biologists
21st-century Romanian scientists
21st-century women scientists
Romanian women scientists
Romanian expatriates in Japan
Iuliu Hațieganu University of Medicine and Pharmacy alumni
Kyoto University alumni
Riken personnel